Afghanistan is divided into 34 provinces (wilåyat). The provinces of Afghanistan are the primary administrative divisions. Each province encompasses a number of districts or usually over 1,000 villages.

Provincial governors played a critical role in the reconstruction of the Afghan state following the creation of the new government under Hamid Karzai. According to international security scholar Dipali Mukhopadhyay, many of the provincial governors of the western-backed government were former warlords who were incorporated into the political system.

Provinces of Afghanistan

Regions of Afghanistan

UN Regions

Former provinces of Afghanistan 

During Afghanistan's history it had a number of provinces in it. It started out as just Kabul, Herat, Qandahar, and Balkh but the number of provinces increased and by 1880 the provinces consisted of Balkh, Herat, Qandahar, Ghazni, Jalalabad, and Kabul.
 Southern Province – dissolved in 1964 to create Paktia Province. 
 Turkestan Province – dissolved somewhere between 1929 and 1946.
 Qataghan-Badakhshan Province – dissolved in 1963 into Badakhshan Province and Qataghan Province, the latter of which was also dissolved that same year.
 Qataghan Province – dissolved in 1963 into Baghlan Province, Kunduz Province, and Takhar Province.
 Eastern Province – dissolved in 1964 to create Nangarhar Province.
 Farah-Chakansur Province – dissolved in 1964 into Farah Province and Nimruz Province.
 Mazar-i-Sharif Province – dissolved in 1964 into Balkh Province and Jowzjan Province.
 Meymaneh Province – dissolved in 1964 into Badghis Province and Faryab Province.

See also 
 List of current provincial governors in Afghanistan
 Districts of Afghanistan

Notes

References

External links 

Afghanistan Information Management Services (AIMS)
Provincial Governors 
Afghanistan Provinces Map
Xavier de Planhol, 2000, GEOGRAPHY i. Evolution of geographical knowledge: Development of geographical knowledge about Afghanistan., Encyclopædia Iranica.

 
Subdivisions of Afghanistan
Provinces, Afghanistan
Afghanistan 1
Subdivisions of the Islamic Republic of Afghanistan